Albert Bosquet (born 1882) was a Belgian sport shooter. Competing for Belgium, he won a silver medal in team clay pigeons at the 1920 Summer Olympics in Antwerp.

References

1882 births
Date of death missing
Belgian male sport shooters
Olympic shooters of Belgium
Olympic silver medalists for Belgium
Shooters at the 1920 Summer Olympics
Shooters at the 1924 Summer Olympics
Medalists at the 1920 Summer Olympics
Olympic medalists in shooting
20th-century Belgian people